Caesar Rodney is a marble sculpture depicting the American lawyer and politician of the same name by Bryant Baker, installed in the United States Capitol's crypt, in Washington, D.C., as part of the National Statuary Hall Collection. The statue was gifted by the U.S. state of Delaware in 1934.

See also
 Equestrian statue of Caesar Rodney

References

External links

 

1934 establishments in Washington, D.C.
Marble sculptures in Washington, D.C.
Monuments and memorials in Washington, D.C.
Rodney, Caesar
Sculptures of men in Washington, D.C.
Statues of U.S. Founding Fathers